Comedians' Comedians was a radio programme that aired from November 2000 to February 2003.  There were 16 half-hour episodes and it was broadcast on BBC Radio 2.  It starred Angus Deayton.

References 
 Lavalie, John. Comedians' Comedians. EpGuides. 21 Jul 2005. 29 Jul 2005  <http://epguides.com/ComediansComedians/>.

BBC Radio 2 programmes
2000 radio programme debuts